A climbing specialist or climber, also known as a grimpeur, is a road bicycle racer who can ride especially well on highly inclined roads, such as those found among hills or mountains.

Role of climber in a race
In a sustained climb, the average speed declines, the aerodynamic advantage of drafting is diminished and the setting of the group pace becomes more important.  A good climber modulates his speed and chooses the best line on a climb, allowing the following riders to have an easier job.  If the group maintains a high tempo, it is more difficult for a rider to attack and ride away from the group.

Another important role in climbing is that of attacker or counter-attacker.  Climbing specialists use their superior abilities either to attack on climbs and thereby gap the competitors, knowing that only other climbing specialists will be able to stay with them, or simply to maintain a high pace that others cannot match.  A successful escape can help the climber achieve a victory if the race has a mountain-top finish, or even in a flat finish if the climber is able to maintain his lead after the climb is over. Climbing stages, along with individual time trials, are key stages in winning long stage races.

In recent years, climbing specialists have been deployed as Super-domestiques, protecting team leaders with All-round capabilities by setting a strong tempo in mountain stages to deter attacks from rivals, a tactic known as a 'train'. Examples of this include Team Sky climbers Wout Poels, Mikel Landa and Mikel Nieve helping Chris Froome in his multiple Grand Tour victories. Froome himself played a similar role in service of Bradley Wiggins at the 2012 Tour de France.

Types of climbers

Climbers tend to have a lot of endurance and specifically developed muscles for long hard climbs. They also tend to have a slim, lightweight physique, but some can become good climbers through concerted training.

The most successful climbing specialists come in different shapes and specializations.  Climbers with very small physique such as José Rujano (48 kg), Nairo Quintana  (58 kg), Roberto Heras  (60 kg), Alberto Contador  (61 kg) and Gilberto Simoni (58 kg) thrive when the climbs reach dizzying heights and incredibly steep slopes where their low weight makes them more efficient and able to put in repeated acceleration runs. Their endurance also makes them good stage race specialists.  Marco Pantani, champion of the 1998 Tour de France, was able to make attack after attack to quickly tire out his opponents.

Another type of rider or puncheur has a similarly small physique but possess more power which may provide an advantage in short but steep climbs in races including the Ardennes classics. Examples of such hills include the Mur de Huy in the Flèche Wallonne and the Cauberg in the Amstel Gold Race. Examples of such riders include Julian Alaphilippe, Philippe Gilbert, Paolo Bettini and Danilo Di Luca, who are able to sprint their way up the shorter climbs to win a stage or a single-day race. However, their lower endurance is a disadvantage in stage races where the climbs are usually longer, albeit at lower gradients. Many climbers cannot sprint very well because their relative small size does not allow them to match the strength of the bigger, more muscular sprinters.

The last type of climber is the breakaway specialist who can ride aggressively with many attacks and sustain their lead over ascents, descents, and flats. Famous examples include Laurent Jalabert and Richard Virenque both of whom earned their King of the Mountains jerseys in the Tour de France by day-long breakaways amassing points at every summit. Most notably, Laurent Jalabert started his career as a sprinter but later transformed himself into a different type of rider. Rafał Majka won the Polka Dot jersey at the 2014 Tour de France and 2016 Tour de France in a similar manner.

Many riders who are primarily time-trialists have also been able to compete in everything but the steepest climbs because of their good power-to-weight ratio. Tour de France winners Miguel Induráin, Jan Ullrich and Bradley Wiggins were primarily time-trialists but were also among the best in the mountain stages during the years in which they won the Tour de France. Also riders can build up a lead in the individual time trial's and defend the lead they have in the mountain stages, Tom Dumoulin won the 2017 Giro d'Italia and Primož Roglič won the 2021 Vuelta a España by doing this.

Climbing physics and physiology

Sports physiologists have attributed the advantage that small stature holds in cycling up steep ascents to the way in which body mass and body surface area scale according to height (see square–cube law).  As a hypothetical cyclist's height increases, the surface areas of his body increase according to the square of his height whereas the mass of his body increases according to the cube of his height.  The surface area relation applies not only to the total surface area of the body, but also to the surface areas of the lungs and blood vessels, which are primary factors in determining aerobic power. Thus, an equally proportioned cyclist who has 50% more body mass (i.e. is 50% heavier) will generate only about 30% more aerobic power.  On a steep climb most of the cyclist's energy goes into lifting his own weight, so the heavier cyclist will be at a competitive disadvantage.  There is, of course, a lower limit to the benefit of small stature because, among other factors, the cyclist must also lift the weight of his bicycle.  The additional power is proportional to the grade or slope of the road and the speed of the rider along the slope (or along the level line). For a 5% grade, each meter of road requires lifting the body weight by 5 cm.  The power (watts) is equal to change in gravitational potential energy (joules) per unit time (seconds). For a  rider, the additional power needed is about 30 watts per meter/second  of road speed (about 8 watts per km/hour).

Scaling factors also account for the relative disadvantage of the small cyclist in descending, although this is a result of physics, not physiology. A larger rider will be subject to a greater gravitational force because of their greater body mass. Additionally, as mentioned, the frontal area that creates aerodynamic drag increases only quadratically with the rider's size, and hence the larger rider would be expected to accelerate faster and attain a greater terminal velocity.

Although these factors might seem to cancel each other out, the climber still has an advantage on a course with long ascents and long descents: adding several miles per hour on a slow, time-consuming climb is much more valuable than the same increase on a fast and brief descent.  Any rider, of course, can improve their climbing speed by increasing their aerobic power and reducing their body weight and can increase their descending speed through better bike handling and the willingness to accept an increased risk of crashing.  One of the few elite riders to use descending skill as a competitive advantage is Paolo Savoldelli, nicknamed "the falcon."

For a more quantitative treatment of climbing physics and physiology, see Swain, DP, Cycling: Uphill and Downhill .

Bicycle technology
Recent advances in bicycle components give the rider a wider range of gearing choices, allowing climbing specialists to use lower gears to ascend optimally while still having the higher gears necessary to keep up with other riders in the flatter sections. Legendary climbers of the past such as Lucien Van Impe had to ride out of the saddle pushing high gears for hours at a time; climbers today are better able to match their gearing to the challenge and climb at a more reasonable cadence. Although many bike manufacturers can create bikes much lighter than this, the UCI deems this weight fair in the spirit of preserving the 'primacy of man' over his equipment.

King of the Mountains in stage races

 Most stage races have a special category for the best climber, usually by awarding points at the important summits of the race. In the Tour de France for example, the best climber, or "King of the Mountains", is awarded a red polka dot jersey (French: maillot à pois rouges). In the Giro d'Italia the best climber is awarded a blue jersey (Italian: maglia azzurra). In the Vuelta a España the best climber is awarded a blue polka dot jersey.

Examples of climbers

Active riders
  Egan Bernal
  Chris Froome
  Rafał Majka
  Vincenzo Nibali
  Tadej Pogačar
  Nairo Quintana
  Jonas Vingegaard
  Richard Carapaz

Former riders
  Lance Armstrong
  José Azevedo
  Federico Bahamontes
  Ivan Basso
  Gino Bartali
  Alberto Contador
 Fausto Coppi
  Charly Gaul
  Roberto Heras
  Luis Herrera
  Laurent Jalabert
  Julio Jiménez
  Marco Pantani
  Michael Rasmussen
  Joaquim Rodríguez
  Andy Schleck
  Gilberto Simoni
  Lucien Van Impe
  Richard Virenque

References

Further reading
 Owen Mulholland, John Wilcockson. Uphill Battle: Cycling's Great Climbers. VeloPress, 2003.

Road bicycle racing terminology